is a city in Nagano Prefecture, Japan.

Azumino may also refer to :

, part of the Matsumoto Basin in Nagano Prefecture, Japan
Azumino (安曇野), a 1974 work by Japanese author Yoshimi Usui